DXLT (99.9 FM), broadcasting as 99.9 RPFM, is a radio station owned by Kaissar Broadcasting Network and operated by RP Advertising and Communications. The station's studio is located at the 3rd Floor, Casaway Bldg., Abad Santos St., Tagum, and its transmitter is located in Mawab.

On December 11, 2019, RPFM's transmitter site is burned down by unidentified men.

References

Radio stations in Davao del Norte
Radio stations established in 2015